Olha Zemlyak (born 16 January 1990) is a Ukrainian athlete who competes in the sprint.

Career
Zemlyak won the gold medal with Ukraine at the 2012 European Athletics Championships in Helsinki in the 4 × 400 metres relay.

Doping suspensions
Zemlyak tested positive for norandrosterone at the 2009 European Athletics Junior Championships and was subsequently banned from sports for two years. Her results from the championships were annulled, and Ukraine lost the 4 × 400 metre relay gold. The competition ban ended 24 August 2011.

Zemlyak then tested positive again on the eve of the 2017 World Championships in Athletics and was suspended from competing in the championships.

In March 2019, the CAS confirmed that Zemlyak committed the anti-doping rule infractions and confirmed the UAF Executive Committee decisions about disqualification of Zemlyak for eight years starting from 5 July 2016. Her results at the 2016 Olympic Games were annulled.

Competition record

References

External links

 

1990 births
Living people
Sportspeople from Rivne
Ukrainian female sprinters
Ukrainian sportspeople in doping cases
Doping cases in athletics
Athletes (track and field) at the 2012 Summer Olympics
Athletes (track and field) at the 2016 Summer Olympics
Olympic athletes of Ukraine
Olympic female sprinters
World Athletics Championships athletes for Ukraine
European Athletics Championships medalists
Olympic bronze medalists for Ukraine
Medalists at the 2012 Summer Olympics
Olympic bronze medalists in athletics (track and field)